Eutropius is a Greek personal name.  It may refer to:

 Eutropius (historian), a fourth century Roman historian, and author of an abridgement of Roman history
 Eutropius (consul 399), a Roman consul, put to death by the emperor Arcadius in AD 399

Church Fathers
 Saint Eutropius of Saintes, a first- or third-century bishop, martyred while attempting to convert the Gauls
 Saint Eutropius the Lector, a fifth-century lector in Constantinople martyred for supporting John Chrysostom  
 Saint Eutropius of Orange, fifth-century bishop of Arausio, now Orange in France
 Saint Eutropius of Valencia, a Spanish bishop of the late sixth and early seventh century